The UEFA U-17 Championship 2007 elite round was the second round of qualifications for the main tournament of 2007 UEFA European Under-17 Championship. England, Spain and Portugal automatically qualified for this round. The winners of each group joined hosts Belgium at the main tournament.

Group 1

Group 2

Group 3

Group 4

Group 5

Group 6

Group 7

Elite Qualification
UEFA European Under-17 Championship qualification